Arkadiusz Stefan Bachur (22 April 1961 – 30 March 1995) was a Polish equestrian. He competed in two events at the 1992 Summer Olympics.

References

External links
 

1961 births
1995 deaths
Polish male equestrians
Olympic equestrians of Poland
Equestrians at the 1992 Summer Olympics
Sportspeople from Gdynia